An unenforced law (also symbolic law, dead letter law) is a law which is formally in effect (de jure), but is usually (de facto) not penalized by a jurisdiction. Such laws are usually ignored by law enforcement, and therefore there are few or no practical consequences for breaking them. The existence of unenforced laws has been criticized for undermining the legal system in general, as such laws may be selectively enforced.

Overview
Unenforced laws may be enacted purely for symbolic reasons, with little or no intention of enforcement. There are also circumstances in which an otherwise enforced law is not; for example, speeding in a motor vehicle is illegal in most jurisdictions, however law enforcement may choose to ignore motorists who only slightly exceed the legal speed limit. Automated traffic enforcement cameras may still issue fines in these circumstances in some jurisdictions.

Although incest is illegal in many European countries, it is generally not enforced if between two consenting adults.

Symbolic laws typically attempt to persuade rather than enforce, punish or prevent. For example, until the relevant statute was repealed in 2013, adultery was prohibited by law in the US state of Colorado, but no criminal penalty was specified. In Maryland, adultery is prohibited, however the statutory criminal penalty is limited to a $10 fine.

See also
Decriminalization
Desuetude
Statute Law Revision Act
Unenforceable
Victimless crime

References

Criminal law